The Yeloguy is a river in Krasnoyarsk Krai, Russia. It is one of the main tributaries of the Yenisey. Its basin marks the eastern limit of the Siberian Uvaly.

The lower reaches of the river are navigable downstream from Kellog. The Yeloguy was one of the places where Ket singer Alexander Kotusov found inspiration for his songs.

Course
The Yeloguy has its source in the West Siberian Plain. It flows roughly northeastwards across the flatland and in its lower course it meanders in the mostly flat and swampy taiga. About  before the mouth, the Crooked Yeloguy (Krivoy Yeloguy) splits to the right and flows roughly parallel to the main river.

The Yeloguy joins the left bank of the Yenisey forming a many-branched delta near Verkhne Imbatskoye (Verkhneimbatsk) village, located on the facing bank of the Yenisey. 
The confluence is located roughly halfway between the mouths of the rivers Sym and Turukhan. The river freezes in October and stays frozen until mid-May.

Its main tributaries are the Kellog, Bolshaya Sigovaya and the Tyna.

Protected area
A  taiga zone of the lower course of the river, including its confluence with the Tyna, was established as the Yeloguy Nature Reserve (Елогуйский Заказник) on 10 March 1987. The protected area is under the Central Siberia Nature Reserve.

See also

List of rivers of Russia

References

External links
Fishing in Russia
Rivers of Krasnoyarsk Krai